Ronald Robert Peel (9 August 1946 – 1 November 2020), also known professionally as Rockwell T. James, was an Australian guitarist, singer and songwriter.

Biography
Peel began his career in music in the early 1960s as bassist for the Port Macquarie surf band The Mystics. In 1964, Peel and Mystics' lead guitarist Dave Boyne were recruited to join The Missing Links. The band was known for its long unruly hair, and pioneered the use of audio feedback and reverse tape effects in Australia. They enjoyed moderate success in Sydney and released a single on Parlophone in March 1965. Peel left the band in June 1965.

Peel next joined Sydney-based band The Pleazers. With a New Zealand recording contract and a club residency, they relocated to Auckland where they achieved a number of hit singles and a significant following. Peel left the band in late 1966. In 1967 he joined a revived Ray Brown & the Whispers for a short time.

In 1968 Peel launched a solo career under the name Rockwell T James. Backed by his band The Rhythm Aces, he released one single "Love Power" which peaked at #52 on the AMR Top 100 singles chart.

Peel travelled to the United Kingdom in 1971 and briefly joined Thunderclap Newman. When that band broke up in April 1971, he returned to Australia and was asked to join One Ton Gypsy, a supergroup put together by Ray Brown, which included Alison MacCallum and Chrissy Amphlett. One Ton Gypsy eventually folded due to the cost of maintaining such a large group.

The La De Da's, led by Kevin Borich, formed in New Zealand in 1963. The band enjoyed great success in Australia and New Zealand but by late 1972 they broke up. Borich decided to rebuild the group as a trio, and approached Peel to join as bassist. The reformed group continued the band's success, and released several records. In July 1973 the band's vehicle was involved in a serious road crash that destroyed their gear and put Peel in hospital. Although they were still a top concert attraction, in early 1975 Borich decided to disband the group.

In 1975, John Paul Young achieved his first #1 single with "Yesterday's Hero". Deciding to tour off the success of this record, Young formed the All Stars Band, including Peel as bassist. Peel would continue to return to the All Stars for the next 45 years to support Young, until Peels' death in 2020.

Several members of the All Stars issued solo records to capitalise on their new-found visibility. Peel resurrected his Rockwell T. James persona, and recorded prolifically in the period 1976–1979, releasing six singles and an album, A Shot of Rhythm and Blues. His most successful single was "Roxanne", co-written by Peel with Garth Porter and Tony Mitchell from Sherbet. It reached #39 in the AMR Top 100.

Between gigs with the All Stars, Peel performed with the Scattered Aces in 1983–1984 and Slightly Shadey in 1987. In 2013 he formed duo The Rockwells with Bobby Fletcher. They released an album Cover Story in 2015.

References 

1946 births
2020 deaths
Australian guitarists
21st-century Australian male singers
20th-century Australian male singers